Dream Chaser is an American reusable lifting-body spaceplane being developed by Sierra Nevada Corporation (SNC) Space Systems. Originally intended as a crewed vehicle, the Dream Chaser Space System is set to be produced after the cargo variant, Dream Chaser Cargo System, is operational. The crewed variant is planned to carry up to seven people and cargo to and from low Earth orbit.

The cargo Dream Chaser is designed to resupply the International Space Station with both pressurized and unpressurized cargo. It is intended to launch vertically on the Vulcan Centaur rocket and autonomously land horizontally on conventional runways. A proposed version to be operated by ESA would launch on an Arianespace vehicle.

Spacecraft

The Dream Chaser design is derived from NASA's HL-20 Personnel Launch System spaceplane concept, which in turn is descended from a series of test vehicles, including the X-20 Dyna-Soar, Northrop M2-F2, Northrop M2-F3, Northrop HL-10, Martin X-24A and X-24B, and Martin X-23 PRIME.

Technology partners 
In 2010, the following organizations were named as technology partners for the original passenger Dream Chaser:
 Aerojet – reaction control system technology
 AdamWorks – composites
 Charles Stark Draper Laboratory – guidance, navigation, and control
 Lockheed Martin – airframe construction and human rating of the spaceplane
 MDA – systems engineering
 University of Colorado – human-rating

Propulsion 
On-orbit propulsion of the Dream Chaser was originally proposed to be provided by twin hybrid rocket engines capable of repeated starts and throttling. At the time, SNC Space Systems was also developing a similar hybrid rocket for Virgin Galactic's SpaceShipTwo.  In May 2014, SNC involvement in the SpaceShipTwo program ended.

After the acquisition of Orbitec LLC in July 2014, Sierra Nevada Corporation announced a major change to the propulsion system. The hybrid rocket engine design was dropped in favor of a cluster of Orbitec's Vortex engines. The new engines would use propane and nitrous oxide as propellants.

Thermal protection system 

Its thermal protection system (TPS) is made up of silica-based tiles (for most of the belly and upper portion of the heat shield), and a new composite material called Toughened Unipiece Fibrous Reusable Oxidation Resistant Ceramic (TUFROC) to cover the nose and leading edges.

Crewed version

The originally planned Dream Chaser Space System is a human-rated version designed to carry from three to seven people and cargo to orbital destinations such as the International Space Station. It was to have a built-in launch escape system and could fly autonomously if needed. Although it could use any suitable launch vehicle, it was planned to be launched on a human-rated Atlas V N12 rocket. The vehicle will be able to return from space by gliding (typically experiencing less than 1.5 g on re-entry) and landing on any airport runway that handles commercial air traffic. Its reaction control system thrusters burned ethanol-based fuel, which is not an explosively volatile material, nor toxic like hydrazine, allowing the Dream Chaser to be handled immediately after landing, unlike the Space Shuttle.

As of 2020, the Sierra Nevada Corporation says it still plans to produce a crewed version of the spacecraft within the next 5 years. The company says it "never stopped working" on the crewed version and fully intends to launch it after the cargo version, and is still committed to the crewed version as of 2021. In November 2021, Sierra Nevada Corporation reported that it received a $1.4 billion investment in Series A funding, which it will use to develop a crewed version of Dream Chaser and fly astronauts by 2025.

On 25 October 2021, Blue Origin and Sierra Nevada Corporation's Sierra Space subsidiary for commercial space activities and space tourism, released their plan for a commercial space station. The station, called Orbital Reef, is intended as a "mixed-use business park". Sierra Nevada Corporation's Dream Chaser was chosen as one of the commercial spacecraft to transport commercial crew to and from the space station, along with Boeing's Starliner.

CRS-2 cargo version

The cargo version of the SNC Dream Chaser is called the Dream Chaser Cargo System (DCCS) and after development completes (planned for January 2023), will fly resupply flights to the ISS under NASA's Commercial Resupply Services-2 program. Featuring an expendable cargo module mounting solar panels, the spacecraft will be capable of returning  to Earth while undergoing maximum re-entry forces of 1.5G.

To meet CRS-2 guidelines, the cargo Dream Chaser will have folding wings and fit within a 5 m diameter payload fairing, in contrast to the Crewed Dream Chaser, which is intended to launch without a fairing. Total uplift is planned for  pressurized and  unpressurized, with a downlift of  contained within the spaceplane. The expendable cargo module is called "Shooting Star".

On August 14, 2019, it was announced that all six Dream Chaser CRS-2 flights will be carried into orbit by ULA's Vulcan launch vehicle, with the first Dream Chaser flight being the second Vulcan flight in late 2021. However, on February 9, 2022, Ken Shields, Sierra Space's Director of Commercial Market Development announced that the first flight would be pushed to January 2023.

National Security version
On November 19, 2021, Sierra Space announced that it is considering a third Dream Chaser version specialized for National Security missions, though it declined to comment on what the differences compared with other versions would be.

Shooting Star module

In 2019, it was announced that an expendable Shooting Star cargo module would be part of the Dream Chaser cargo system for CRS-2 flights. The module supports disposal of unwanted cargo by burning up upon re-entry.

In addition to carrying cargo, the Shooting Star module includes solar panels that supply up to 6 kW of electrical power. It also supplies active and passive thermal management; provides Dream Chaser translation & rotation capability via six mounted thrusters; and supports berthing or docking (in different configurations) to the ISS. Access from ISS to Dream Chaser will involve crew passing through Shooting Star (which supports a shirt-sleeve environment) and through a hatch that separates Shooting Star from Dream Chaser. Sierra Nevada says the module is capable of additional types of missions in LEO or to cis-lunar destinations; they have developed a free-flying variant with additional capabilities.

In July 2020, Sierra Nevada announced a contract with the Defense Innovation Unit (DIU) to use its Shooting Star expendable cargo vehicle as a possible commercial solution for a high-powered uncrewed orbital outpost.

Program history
The name "Dream Chaser" had been previously used for two separate space vehicle concepts. The first was planned to be an orbital vehicle based on the HL-20, with the second suborbital vehicle proposed by the Benson Space Company for the purposes of space tourism.

The Dream Chaser was publicly announced on September 20, 2004. In April 2007, SpaceDev announced that it had partnered with the United Launch Alliance to pursue the possibility of using the Atlas V booster rocket as the Dream Chaser's launch vehicle. In June 2007, SpaceDev signed a Space Act agreement with NASA.

On 21 October 2008, SpaceDev with Dream Chaser was acquired by the Sierra Nevada Corporation for US$38 million.

CCDev phase 1
On 1 February 2010, Sierra Nevada Corporation was awarded $20 million in seed money under NASA's Commercial Crew Development (CCDev)  program for the development of the Dream Chaser. SNC completed the four planned milestones on time, including hybrid rocket test fires and the preliminary structure design. Further initial Dream Chaser tests included the drop test of a 15% scaled version at the NASA Dryden Flight Research Center.

CCDev phase 2
Sierra Nevada proposed Dream Chaser for the CCDev phase 2 solicitation by NASA in October 2010, with an estimated project cost of less than $1 billion. On 18 April 2011, NASA awarded $80 million to Sierra Nevada Corporation for Dream Chaser. Since then, nearly a dozen further milestones have been completed under that Space Act Agreement. Some of these milestones included testing of an improved airfoil fin shape, integrated flight software and hardware, landing gear, a full-scale captive carry flight test, and a Systems Requirement Review (SRR).

By February 2012, Sierra Nevada Corporation stated that it had completed the assembly and delivery of the primary structure of the first Dream Chaser flight test vehicle. With this, SNC completed all 11 of its CCDev milestones that were scheduled up to that point. SNC stated in a press release that it was "on time and on budget."

On 29 May 2012, the Dream Chaser Engineering Test Article (ETA) was lifted by an Erickson Skycrane helicopter in a captive carry test to better determine its aerodynamic properties. In May 2013, the ETA was shipped to the Dryden Flight Research Center in California for a series of ground tests and aerodynamic flight tests.  A second captive carry flight test was completed on 22 August 2013.

On 12 June 2012, SNC announced the commemoration of its fifth year as a NASA Langley partner in the design and development of Dream Chaser. The NASA/SNC team had worked on aerodynamic and aerothermal analysis of Dream Chaser, as well as guidance, navigation, and control systems. Together with ULA, the NASA/SNC team performed buffet tests on the Dream Chaser and Atlas V stack.

On 11 July 2012, SNC announced that it successfully completed testing of the nose landing gear for Dream Chaser. This milestone evaluated the impact to the landing gear during simulated approach and landing tests as well as the impact of future orbital flights. The main landing gear was tested in a similar way in February 2012. The nose gear landing test was the last milestone to be completed before the free flight approach and landing tests scheduled for later in 2012. In August 2012, SNC completed CCiCap Milestone 1, or the 'Program Implementation Plan Review'. This included creating a plan for implementing design, development, testing, and evaluation activities through the duration of CCiCap funding. By October 2012 the "Integrated System Baseline Review", or CCiCap Milestone 2, had been completed.  This review demonstrated the maturity of the Dream Chaser Space System as well as the integration and support of the Atlas V launch vehicle, mission systems, and ground systems.

CCiCap
On 3 August 2012, NASA announced the award of $212.5 million to Sierra Nevada Corporation to continue work on the Dream Chaser under the Commercial Crew Integrated Capability (CCiCap) Program. On 30 January 2013, SNC announced a new partnership with Lockheed Martin.  Under the agreement, SNC will pay Lockheed Martin $10 million to build the second airframe at its Michoud facility in New Orleans, Louisiana. This second airframe is slated to be the first orbital test vehicle, with orbital flight testing planned to begin within the next two years.

In January 2013, Sierra Nevada announced that the second captive carry and first unpowered drop test of Dream Chaser would take place at Edwards Air Force Base, California in March 2013.  The spaceplane release would occur at  altitude and would be followed by an autonomous robotic landing.

On 13 March 2013, NASA announced that former Space Shuttle commander Lee Archambault was leaving the agency in order to join SNC.  Archambault, a former combat pilot and 15-year NASA veteran who flew on Atlantis and Discovery, will work on the Dream Chaser program as a systems engineer and test pilot.

On October 26, 2013, the first free-flight occurred. The test vehicle was released from the helicopter and flew the correct flightpath to touchdown less than a minute later. Just prior to landing, the left main landing gear failed to deploy resulting in a crash landing. The vehicle skidded off the runway in a cloud of dust, but was found upright with the crew compartment intact and all systems inside still in working order.

In January 2014, SNC announced it had signed a launch contract to fly the first orbital test vehicle on a robotically controlled orbital test flight in November 2016.

In early 2014, Sierra Nevada completed its wind tunnel testing as part of its CCiCAP Milestone 8. The wind tunnel testing involved analyzing the flight dynamics characteristics that the vehicle will experience during orbital ascent and re-entry.  Wind tunnel testing was also completed for the Dream Chaser Atlas V integrated launch system. These tests were completed at NASA Ames Research Center at Moffett Field, California, CALSPAN Transonic Wind Tunnel in New York, and at NASA Langley Research Center Unitary Plan Wind Tunnel in Hampton, Virginia.

On 1 August 2014, the first completed piece of the orbital Flight Test Article (FTA) composite airframe was unveiled at a Lockheed Martin facility.

CCtCap
On 16 September 2014, NASA did not select the Dream Chaser for CCtCap, the next phase of the Commercial Crew Program. This occurred despite previous Commercial Crew Development awards in every phase since 2009, due to lack of maturity.

On 26 September, Sierra Nevada filed a protest to the US Government Accountability Office (GAO).
On 22 October 2014, a Federal Judge ruled the contract awards to Boeing and SpaceX valid, allowing NASA to proceed.

On 29 September 2014, Sierra Nevada introduced the "Dream Chaser Global Project" which would provide customized access to low Earth orbit to global customers.

Despite not being selected to continue forward under NASA's Commercial Crew transportation Capability (CCtCap) phase of the effort to send crews to orbit via private companies, SNC completed the milestones assigned under earlier phases of the CCP. On December 2, 2014, SNC announced that it completed NASA's CCiCap Milestone 5a related to propulsion risk reduction for the Dream Chaser space system.

By late December, details had emerged that "a high-ranking agency official"—"William Gerstenmaier, the agency's top human exploration official and the one who made the final decision"—"opted to rank Boeing's proposal higher than a previous panel of agency procurement experts."  More specifically, Sierra Nevada asserted in their filings with the GAO that Gerstenmaier may have "overstepped his authority by unilaterally changing the scoring criteria."

On January 5, 2015, the GAO denied Sierra Nevada's CCtCap challenge, stating that NASA made the proper decision when it decided to award Boeing $4.2 billion and SpaceX $2.6 billion to develop their vehicles.  Ralph White, the GAO's managing associate counsel, announced that NASA "recognized Boeing's higher price but also considered Boeing's proposal to be the strongest of all three proposals in terms of technical approach, management approach and past performance, and to offer the crew transportation system with most utility and highest value to the government."  Furthermore, the agency found "several favorable features" in SNC's proposal "but ultimately concluded that SpaceX's lower price made it a better value."

CRS-2 selection

In December 2014, Sierra Nevada proposed Dream Chaser for CRS-2 consideration. In January 2016, NASA announced that Dream Chaser had been awarded one of the CRS-2 contracts and committed to purchasing a minimum of six resupply missions to the ISS. The cargo spacecraft will fly alongside spacecraft from the existing CRS-1 contract holders SpaceX and Northrop Grumman Innovation Systems.

In October 2015, the thermal protection system was installed on the Engineering Test Article (ETA) for the next phase of atmospheric flight testing. The orbital cabin assembly of the Flight Test Article (FTA) was also completed by contractor Lockheed Martin.

In 2015, the ETA had reportedly been given the name Eagle, while the FTA was originally named Ascalon before being changed to Ascension.

On 11 November 2017, the Dream Chaser ETA was released from an altitude of 3,700 m and successfully landed at Edwards AFB.

In March 2019, completion of NASA's Integrated Review Milestone 5 (IR5) confirmed that development was still on schedule.
In August 2019, SNC announced the first ISS flight of the Dream Chaser, known as SNC Demo-1, was planned for 2021. However, on November 17, 2020, SNC announced it would be delayed until early 2022. In May 2022, it was announced by the deputy manager of ISS, Dana Weigel, that the mission was scheduled for February 2023.

Dream Chaser Global Project

In December 2013, the German Aerospace Center (DLR) announced a funded study to investigate ways in which Europe might take advantage of the Dream Chaser crewed spaceplane technology. Named the DC4EU (Dream Chaser for European Utilization), the project will study using it for sending crews and cargo to the ISS and on missions not involving the ISS, particularly in orbits of substantially greater altitude than the ISS can reach.

In January 2014, the European Space Agency (ESA) agreed to be a partner on the DC4EU project, and will also investigate whether the Dream Chaser can use ESA avionics and docking mechanisms.  ESA will also study launching options for the "Europeanized" Dream Chaser, particularly whether it can be launched from the Guiana Space Centre, within the Ariane 5's large aerodynamic cargo fairing – or, like the Atlas V, without it. In order to fit within the fairing, the Dream Chaser's wing length will have to be reduced slightly, which is thought to be easier than going through a full aerodynamic test program to evaluate and prove it along with the Ariane for flight without the fairing. The Ariane 5 launch vehicle was designed from its inception to be crew rated, in order to launch the Hermes Spaceplane, an ESA crewed vehicle which was proposed in the 1980s and 1990s, but was cancelled.

In late January 2014, it was announced that the Dream Chaser orbital test vehicle was under contract to be launched on an initial orbital test flight, using an Atlas V rocket, from Kennedy Space Center in November 2016.  This was a privately arranged commercial agreement, and was funded directly by Sierra Nevada and was not a part of any existing NASA contract.

In September 2014, SNC announced that it would, with global partners, use the Dream Chaser as the baseline spacecraft for orbital access for a variety of programs, specializing the craft as needed.

On 5 November 2014, SNC's Space Systems team publicly presented the challenges and opportunities related to landing the Dream Chaser spacecraft at public-use airports. Dream Chaser uses standard landing aids and non-toxic propellants that require no special handling.

Dream Chaser for European Utilization
On February 3, 2015, the Sierra Nevada Corporation's (SNC) Space Systems and OHB System AG (OHB) in Germany announced the completion of the initial Dream Chaser for European Utilization (DC4EU) study. The study found that Dream Chaser is suitable for a broad range of space applications and could be used to advance European interests in space. 

The cooperation was renewed in April 2015 for an additional two years.

United Nations
The United Nations Office for Outer Space Affairs (UNOOSA) selected the cargo Dream Chaser for its first space launch. This launch is intended to last for at least two weeks in freeflight to provide space access to United Nations member states that have no space programs of their own.

In 2019, the launch date for the proposed mission, expected to carry up to 35 payloads, was set for 2024.

List of vehicles

Missions
List only includes manifested missions.
A demonstration and six missions are currently planned to be launched from Cape Canaveral SLC-41 on Vulcan Centaur, and one more flight has been ordered to fly from Guiana Space Center  for the United Nations on board an Arianespace vehicle.

See also 

Spaceplanes
 RLV Technology Demonstration Programme
 Boeing X-37
 Space Rider
 NASA X-38
 Boeing X-20 Dyna-Soar
 Mikoyan-Gurevich MiG-105
 Hermes (spacecraft)
 RSC Energia Kliper

Other ISS cargo vehicles:
 Comparison of space station cargo vehicles
 Commercial Resupply Services
 Automated Transfer Vehicle
 Cygnus (spacecraft)
 SpaceX Dragon 1
 SpaceX Dragon 2
 H-II Transfer Vehicle
 Progress (spacecraft)
 Soyuz GVK
Other ISS crew vehicles:
 Commercial Crew Development
 Boeing Starliner
 SpaceX Crew Dragon
 Orel (spacecraft)
 Soyuz (spacecraft)

References

External links 

 Sierra Nevada Corporation Space Systems web site
 SNC Space Systems' Dream Chaser page
 SpaceDev web site
 United Launch Alliance web site
 CG rendering of Dream Chaser servicing ISS
 Video animation — SpaceDev International Lunar Observatory Human Servicing Mission concept

Spaceplanes
Private spaceflight
Proposed spacecraft
Aircraft first flown in 2013
Lifting bodies
Sierra Nevada Corporation aircraft
American spacecraft
Reusable spacecraft
Proposed crewed spacecraft